Víctor Rivera (born August 30, 1976) is a volleyball player from Puerto Rico, who was a member of the Men's National Team that ended up in sixth place at the 2007 FIVB Men's World Cup in Japan. In the same year the wing-spiker was named Best Spiker at the NORCECA Championship in Anaheim. He won with his team the Bronze medal and the Best Scorer individual award at the 2010 Pan-American Cup.

Awards

Individuals
 2010 Pan-American Cup "Best Scorer"
 2007 NORCECA Championship "Best Spiker"

References

External links
 FIVB Profile
 Víctor Rivera Professional Profile

1976 births
Living people
Puerto Rican men's volleyball players
Volleyball players at the 2007 Pan American Games
Place of birth missing (living people)
Galatasaray S.K. (men's volleyball) players
Puerto Rican expatriate sportspeople
Pan American Games competitors for Puerto Rico
Lewis Flyers men's volleyball players